Upper Nyack Firehouse, built for the Empire Hook & Ladder Company, No. 1, is a historic fire station located at Upper Nyack in Rockland County, New York, United States.  It was completed in July 1887 and is a two-story brick structure in the Queen Anne style.  It features a corner bell tower and center gable above the main engine door.

It was listed on the National Register of Historic Places in 1982. It is located in the Van Houten's Landing Historic District.

References

Fire stations on the National Register of Historic Places in New York (state)
Queen Anne architecture in New York (state)
Fire stations completed in 1887
Buildings and structures in Rockland County, New York
National Register of Historic Places in Rockland County, New York
Historic district contributing properties in New York (state)
1887 establishments in New York (state)